Natalya Fedorovna Gvozdikova (born 7 January 1948) is a Soviet and Russian film and theatre actress.

Early life and education
Natalia Gvozdikova was born on 7 January 1948 in the Borzya Chita Oblast. Her father was soldier Feodor Titovich Gvozdikov (1911) and mother was Nina Gvozdikova (1921-2005).

Her elder sister Lyudmila Fedorovna Gvozdikova (1941) is an actress of the Leningrad State Theater of Miniatures under the direction of Arkady Raikin.

She graduated from the VGIK.

Career
Gvozdikova specialized as a theater and film actress (1967-1971, acting course of Sergei Gerasimov and Tamara Makarova). Between 1971–1993 she worked as an actress at the State Theater of the Film Actor.

Selected filmography
 By the Lake (1969)  as girl
 City of First Love (1970)
 Oh, That Nastya! (1971)
 Big School-Break (1973)  as Polina
 The Red Snowball Tree (1974)  as telegraph operator 
  (Rozhdyonnaya revolyutsiey; 1974–77)  as Mariya Kondratyeva 
 Mistress into Maid (1995) as neighbor

Awards
 USSR State Prize (1978)
 Honored Artist of RSFSR (1983)
 Medal of Pushkin 
 People's Artist of Russia (2013)

Personal life
Gvozdikova's husband was actor Evgeny Zharikov (1941-2012), a People's Artist of the USSR. Gvozdikova's son is Fedor Zharikov.

On the set of the TV series ' she dated her on-screen spouse, actor Evgeny Zharikov, and after one year they got married. On 2 August 1976 their son was born, Fedor Zharikov, who graduated from the Institute of Foreign Languages, received the rank of officer, was a French language translator, and now works as a chief information security officer in aircraft construction. In 1994-2001 Zharikov had an affair with the journalist Tatiana Sekridova, who bore him a son Sergei and daughter Katya. After Sekridova went to the press about this, Zharikov ended the relationship, then spoke about the affair with regret and remorse. Gvozdikova reconciled with her husband and they stayed married until his death. Zharikov died on 18 January 2012 in Moscow, at the Botkin hospital from cancer. He was buried on 21 January at the so-called actor's alley of the Troyekurovskoye Cemetery.

References

External links

1948 births
Russian actresses
Soviet actresses
Living people
Recipients of the Medal of Pushkin
People's Artists of Russia
Honored Artists of the RSFSR
Recipients of the USSR State Prize
Gerasimov Institute of Cinematography alumni
20th-century Russian women
People from Borzinsky District